University Valley is a valley about 1 nautical mile (1.9 km) long, lying next northeast of Farnell Valley in the Beacon Valley area of Victoria Land. Named in January 1962 by United States Antarctic Research Program (USARP) researchers Heinz Janetschek and Fiorenzo Ugolini after their respective university affiliation, Leopold-Franzens-Universitat at Innsbruck, Austria, and Rutgers University at New Brunswick, New Jersey.

Valleys of Victoria Land
Scott Coast